Anokhino is a rural locality (a village) in Lyakhovskoye Rural Settlement, Melenkovsky District, Vladimir Oblast, Russia. The population was 27 as of 2010. There are 2 streets.

Geography 
Anokhino is located 41 km northeast of Melenki (the district's administrative centre) by road. Yelino is the nearest rural locality.

References 

Rural localities in Melenkovsky District